Eastmanalepes primaevus is an extinct species of prehistoric jack fish that lived from the Lutetian epoch, of what is now Monte Bolca, Italy.  It was originally described as a species of the jackfish genus Caranx, of which it has a superficially similar outline to.  It differs from Caranx, and almost all other jackfish, in that it has very large, very pronounced scutes along its lateral line.  According to Bannikov, E. primaevus is probably more related to the extinct jackfish genera, Eothynnus and Teratichthys.

See also

 Prehistoric fish
 List of prehistoric bony fish

References

 "Bulletin of the Museum of Comparative Zoology  at harvard college. Volume 46 - Page 29" 
 

Eocene fish
Carangidae
Fossils of Italy